Francesco Giuseppe "Frank" Puglia (9 March 1892 – 25 October 1975) was an Italian actor. He had small, but memorable roles in films including Casablanca (a Moroccan rug merchant), Now, Voyager and The Jungle Book.

Biography 
Born in Linguaglossa, Catania, Sicily, the actor started his career as a teen on stage in Italian operas. He emigrated to the U.S. in 1907. He left from Naples on the ship Italia.

In New York City he worked in a laundry before joining an Italian language theater group. While appearing on stage, he was discovered by D. W. Griffith, which began an acting career spanning over 150 films. He usually played ethnic types in films, and claimed to have learned English from reading newspapers.

He was originally cast as the undertaker, Bonasera, in Francis Ford Coppola's movie The Godfather (1972), even participating in Marlon Brando's screen test, but he fell ill before filming could begin. He was replaced by Sicilian actor Salvatore Corsitto.

He died on October 25, 1975 in South Pasadena, California, and he is buried in the Hollywood Forever Cemetery in Hollywood, California.

On August 10, 2016, he was celebrated in his hometown, Linguaglossa.

Filmography 

 Orphans of the Storm (1921) as Pierre Frochard
 Fascination (1922) as Nema
 Isn't Life Wonderful (1924) as Theodor
 Romola (1924) as Adolfo Spini
 The Beautiful City (1925) as Carlo Gillardi
 The Man Who Laughs (1928) as Clown (uncredited)
 The White Sister (1933) as Celebrating Soldier (uncredited)
 Dinner at Eight (1933) as Butler (uncredited)
 The Solitaire Man (1933) as Waiter (uncredited)
 Men in White (1934) as Dr. Vitale
 Viva Villa! (1934) as Pancho Villa's Father
 Stamboul Quest (1934) as German Aide (uncredited)
 One More River (1934) as Waiter (uncredited)
 Chained (1934) as Cafe Headwaiter (uncredited)
 Bordertown (1935) as Police Commissioner in Mexico (uncredited)
 Red Hot Tires (1935) as Brazilian Radio Announcer (uncredited)
 One New York Night (1935) as Louis the Waiter (uncredited)
 The Melody Lingers On (1935) as Giuseppe
 The Perfect Gentleman (1935) as Waiter (uncredited)
 Okay, José (1935 short) as Comandante Capitán Lopez (uncredited)
 Captain Blood (1935) as French Officer (uncredited)
 Wife vs. Secretary (1935) as Havana Hotel Clerk (uncredited)
 Fatal Lady (1936) as Felipe (uncredited)
 His Brother's Wife (1936) as Jungle Hotel Clerk (uncredited)
 Bulldog Edition (1936) as Henchman Tony (uncredited)
 The Devil Is a Sissy (1936) as 'Grandma'
 The Gay Desperado (1936) as López
 The Public Pays (1936 short) as Moran's Hood (uncredited)
 The Garden of Allah (1936) as Man (uncredited)
 Love on the Run (1936) as Waiter (uncredited)
 Mama Steps Out (1937) as Robert Dalderder - the Priest
 When You're in Love (1937) as Carlos
 A Doctor's Diary (1937) as Louie
 Seventh Heaven (1937) as Postman (uncredited)
 Maytime (1937) as Orchestra Conductor (uncredited)
 We Have Our Moments (1937) as Customs Inspector (uncredited)
 Thin Ice (1937) as First Porter (uncredited)
 Song of the City (1937) as Tony
 King of Gamblers (1937) as Mike (uncredited)
 Exclusive (1937) as Johnny (uncredited)
 You Can't Have Everything (1937) as Waiter at Romano's (uncredited)
 She's No Lady (1937) as Bartender (uncredited)
 The Firefly (1937) as Pablo (uncredited)
 The Bride Wore Red (1937) as Alberto
 Lancer Spy (1937) as Monk (uncredited)
 Beg, Borrow or Steal (1937) as French Detective Looking for Summitt (uncredited)
 Mannequin (1937) as Striking Seaman (uncredited)
 Bulldog Drummond's Revenge (1937) as Draven Nogais
 Change of Heart (1938) as Lucio (uncredited)
 Invisible Enemy (1938) as Signor Bramucci
 A Trip to Paris (1938) as Waiter (uncredited)
 Yellow Jack (1938) as Stagamonte (uncredited)
 Rascals (1938) as Florist
 Joaquin Murrieta (1938 short) as Bronco (uncredited)
 Tropic Holiday (1938) as Co-Pilot (uncredited)
 I'll Give a Million (1938) as Citizen #2
 Barefoot Boy (1938) as Hank
 Spawn of the North (1938) as Red's Gang Member #2 (uncredited)
 The Sisters (1938) as Wireless Operator (uncredited)
 The Shining Hour (1938) as Maurice - the Headwaiter (uncredited)
 Sharpshooters (1938) as Ivan
 Dramatic School (1938) as Alphonse
 Zaza (1939) as Rug Dealer
 Pirates of the Skies (1939) as Jerry Petri
 Mystery of the White Room (1939) as Tony
 Society Lawyer (1939) as Headwaiter (uncredited)
 Forged Passport (1939) as Chief Miguel
 Code of the Secret Service (1939) as Train Conductor (uncredited)
 The Girl and the Gambler (1939) as Gomez
 In Old Caliente (1939) as Don José Vargas
 Maisie (1939) as Ernie
 The Spellbinder (1939) as Headwaiter (uncredited)
 Conspiracy (1939) as Police Capt. Luther (uncredited)
 In Name Only (1939) as Manager - Tony's Cafe (uncredited)
 Lady of the Tropics (1939) as Telegraph Office Clerk (uncredited)
 The Monroe Doctrine (1939 short) as King Ferdinand VII
 Mr. Smith Goes to Washington (1939) as Handwriting Expert (uncredited)
 Charlie Chan in City in Darkness (1939) as Gendarme at Steamship Office (uncredited)
 Balalaika (1939) as Ivan (uncredited)
 The Fatal Hour (1940) as Harry 'Hardway' Lockett
 I Take This Woman (1940) as Milt (scenes deleted)
 Castle on the Hudson (1940) as Tony (uncredited)
 Charlie Chan in Panama (1940) as Achmed Halide
 'Til We Meet Again (1940) as Mexican Bartender (uncredited)
 Torrid Zone (1940) as Rodriguez
 Love, Honor and Oh-Baby! (1940) as Headwaiter
 Argentine Nights (1940) as Police Chief (uncredited)
 Rangers of Fortune (1940) as Stefan (uncredited)
 Down Argentine Way (1940) as Montero
 Arise, My Love (1940) as Father Jacinto
 The Flag of Humanity (1940 short) as Henry Dunant (uncredited)
 Meet the Wildcat (1940) as Chief of Police
 The Mark of Zorro (1940) as Proprietor
 No, No, Nanette (1940) as Art Critic (uncredited)
 Behind the News (1940) as Tomas Almedo (uncredited)
 Tengo fe en ti (1940) as Enrico Buriani
 That Night in Rio (1941) as Pedro
 Billy the Kid (1941) as Pedro Gonzales
 The Parson of Panamint (1941) as Joaquin Fuentes
 World Premiere (1941) as Dapper Officer (uncredited)
 Law of the Tropics (1941) as Tito
 Always in My Heart (1942) as Joe Borelli
 Secret Agent of Japan (1942) as Eminescu
 Jungle Book (1942) as The Pundit
 Who Is Hope Schuyler? (1942) as Baggott
 Escape from Hong Kong (1942) as Kosura
 Flight Lieutenant (1942) as Father Carlos (uncredited)
 The Boogie Man Will Get You (1942) as Silvio Baciagalupi (uncredited)
 Now, Voyager (1942) as Giuseppe (uncredited)
 Casablanca (1942) as Moroccan Rug Merchant (uncredited)
 Journey into Fear (1942) as Colonel Haki's Office Aide (uncredited)
 Mission to Moscow (1943) as Trial Judge Ulrich (uncredited)
 Action in the North Atlantic (1943) as Captain Carpolis (uncredited)
 Pilot No. 5 (1943) as Nikola
 Background to Danger (1943) as Syrian Vendor (uncredited)
 For Whom the Bell Tolls (1943) as Captain Gomez
 Phantom of the Opera (1943) as Villeneuve
 Princess O'Rourke (1943) as Greek Cafe Proprietor (uncredited)
 Around the World (1943) as Native Dealer (uncredited)
 Tarzan's Desert Mystery (1943) as Magistrate
 Ali Baba and the 40 Thieves (1944) as Prince Cassim
 Passage to Marseille (1944) as Older Guard (uncredited)
 This Is the Life (1944) as Music Teacher
 Dragon Seed (1944) as Wu Lien's Old Clerk (uncredited)
 Tall in the Saddle (1944) as Tala (uncredited)
 Brazil (1944) as Señor Machado
 Together Again (1944) as Leonardo (uncredited)
 A Song to Remember (1945) as Monsieur Jollet (uncredited)
 Roughly Speaking (1945) as Tony (uncredited)
 Blood on the Sun (1945) as Prince Tatsugi
 Week-End at the Waldorf (1945) as Emile
 Without Reservations (1946) as Ortega
 Easy Come, Easy Go (1947) as Italian Grocer (uncredited)
 My Favorite Brunette (1947) as Baron Montay
 Stallion Road (1947) as Pelon
 Fiesta (1947) as Doctor
 Brute Force (1947) as Signore Ferrara
 Escape Me Never (1947) as The Guide
 The Lost Moment (1947) as Pietro
 Road to Rio (1947) as Rodrigues
 Dream Girl (1948) as Antonio
 Joan of Arc (1948) as Nicolas de Houppeville, a Judge
 Bride of Vengeance (1949) as Bolfi
 Colorado Territory (1949) as Brother Tomas
 Special Agent (1949) as Grandfather Devereaux
 Bagdad (1949) as Saleel
 Captain Carey, U.S.A. (1950) as Luigi
 Black Hand (1950) as Carlo Sabballera
 Federal Agent at Large (1950) as Angelo 'Angel' Badillo
 The Desert Hawk (1950) as Ahmed Bey
 Walk Softly, Stranger (1950) as A.J. Corelli
 Double Crossbones (1951) as Debtor (uncredited)
 The Bandits of Corsica (1953) as Riggio
 Son of Belle Starr (1953) as Manuel
 The Caddy (1953) as Mr. Spezzato
 The Steel Lady (1953) as Sheik Taras
 Jubilee Trail (1954) as Don Orosco (uncredited)
 Casanova's Big Night (1954) as Carabaccio
 The Shanghai Story (1954) as Mr. Chen
 A Star Is Born (1954) as Bruno (uncredited)
 Serenade (1956) as Manuel Montes
 The First Texan (1956) as Pepe
 The Burning Hills (1956) as Tio Perico
 Accused of Murder (1956) as Cesar Cipriano
 Duel at Apache Wells (1957) as Señor Valdez
 20 Million Miles to Earth (1957) as Dr. Leonardo
 The Black Orchid (1959) as Henry Gallo
 Cry Tough (1959) as Lavandero
 Girls! Girls! Girls! (1962) as Papa Stavros
 The Sword of Ali Baba (1965) as Cassim
 Operation Razzle-Dazzle (1966 TV movie)
 The Spy in the Green Hat (1967) as Padre
 A Bell for Adano (1967 TV movie) as Afronti
 Say Goodbye, Maggie Cole (1972 TV movie) as Mr. Alissandro
 Mr. Ricco (1975) as Uncle Enzo

References

External links

 
 
 
 
 Films and TV.com

1892 births
1975 deaths
Actors from Sicily
Italian emigrants to the United States
Italian male film actors
Italian male silent film actors
Naturalized citizens of the United States
People from the Province of Catania
20th-century American male actors
20th-century Italian male actors